Nikita Yuryevich Bersenev (born 25 March 2000) is a Russian road and track cyclist, who currently rides for UCI Continental team .

Major results

2018
 3rd  Individual pursuit, UEC European Under-23 Track Championships
2019
 1st  Team pursuit, European Games
 National Track Championships
1st  Team pursuit
3rd Scratch
2020
 1st  Team pursuit, UEC European Track Championships
 1st  Team pursuit, UEC European Under-23 Track Championships
 1st  Team pursuit, National Track Championships
 10th Grand Prix Develi

References

External links

2000 births
Living people
Russian male cyclists
Russian track cyclists
European Games gold medalists for Russia
Cyclists at the 2019 European Games
European Games medalists in cycling